Paraidemona is a genus of spur-throated grasshoppers in the family Acrididae. There are about nine described species in Paraidemona.

Species
These nine species belong to the genus Paraidemona:
 Paraidemona cohni Fontana & Buzzetti, 2007 c g
 Paraidemona fratercula Hebard, 1918 i c g b
 Paraidemona latifurcula Hebard, 1918 i c g b
 Paraidemona mimica Scudder, 1897 i c g b (mimic grasshopper)
 Paraidemona nudus (Scudder, 1878) i
 Paraidemona nuttingi Yin & Smith, 1989 i c g b
 Paraidemona olsoni Yin & Smith, 1989 i c g b
 Paraidemona punctata (Stål, 1878) i c g b
 Paraidemona ruvalcabae Buzzetti, Barrientos Lozano & Fontana, 2010 c g
Data sources: i = ITIS, c = Catalogue of Life, g = GBIF, b = Bugguide.net

References

Further reading

 
 

Melanoplinae
Articles created by Qbugbot